The Beotibar fronton is a short fronton located in Tolosa, Gipuzkoa. The fronton is mainly dedicated to hand-pelota and it was home of the 1958 and the 1962 1st Hand-Pelota singles championships as of 1962, 1965, 1970, 1971 and 2009 editions of 2nd Hand-Pelota singles championship.

Championships

1st Hand-Pelota Singles championship

2nd Hand-Pelota singles championship 

Basque pelota
Fronton (court)
Sports venues in the Basque Country (autonomous community)
1890 establishments in Spain
Sports venues completed in 1890